Jwaneng Galaxy Football Club is a Botswana football club based in Jwaneng. The club currently plays in the Botswana Premier League.

History
Galaxy were founded in 2015 after two local clubs merged: the Jwaneng Comets and the Debswana Youngsters.

Galaxy were promoted to the Botswana Premier League for the first time in 2015, winning the First Division South with a match to spare.

Botswana Premier League
Led by Zambian coach Mike Sithole, Galaxy won the club's first silverware in 2016–17, the Mascom Top 8 Cup, beating Orapa United in extra time in the final. They also finished second in the Botswana Premier League and qualified for the 2018 CAF Confederation Cup. Sitole was fired in November 2017, but Galaxy ended the 2017–18 campaign in second again, only four points off of champions Township Rollers F.C.

Miguel da Costa became the head coach for the 2018–19 campaign after leaving Uganda's Vipers SC.

African competition
Under Morena Ramoreboli, Galaxy qualified for the group stages of the African Champions League for the first time in 2021–22.

Honours

League 
 Botswana Premier League: 1
Champion :  2020
Runners-up : 2017, 2018, 2019
Botswana First Division South: 1
Champion : 2015

Cups
Mascom Top 8 Cup: 2
2016–17, 2018–19

Players

CAF competitions record
Last update: 24 February 2023

Notes

 PR: Preliminary round
 1R: First round
 2Q: Second qualifying round
 GS: Group stage

References

External links
Facebook page

Football clubs in Botswana